"Dream, Dream" is the second single by the Dutch girl group Luv', released in November 1977 by Philips/Phonogram Records. It appears on the group's first album With Luv' (1978).

Background
The previous single ("My Man") was the group's debut record in 1977 and charted in the Benelux countries. The follow-up single was entitled "Dream, Dream". The musical arrangements were inspired by the sound of ABBA. It flopped and the group seemed to be a one-hit wonder. The real breakthrough came in 1978 with the success of "U.O.Me (Theme from Waldolala)" and "You're the Greatest Lover".

Commercial performance
The single failed to enter the Dutch Top 40. However, in December 1977, it peaked at #16 on the Tipparade which listed the singles below number 40 that did not enter the official Dutch charts.

Track listing and release
7" vinyl
 a. "Dream, Dream"
 b. "Hang On"

Sources
 Details about release of "Dream, Dream" on Discogs database
 Luv' "Dream Dream" - general info, 40th anniversary 2017
 Release information on Rate Your Music website

References

Songs about dreams
1977 singles
Luv' songs
Songs written by Hans van Hemert
Songs written by Piet Souer
1977 songs